Chakpa (Meitei exonym: Loi) is an extinct Sino-Tibetan language that was spoken in the Imphal valley of Manipur, India. It belonged to the Luish branch of the Sino-Tibetan family. Chakpa speakers have been shifted to that of Meitei language. Varieties of the language included Sengmai and Andro.

Chakpa was spoken in villages such as Andro, Sekmai (Sengmai), Phayeng, and Chairel, all of which are now Meitei-speaking villages.

Other names

Loi (or Lui; hence "Luish") is a Meithei exonym that includes Chakpa. Although Chakpa are typically considered to be Loi, not all Loi are Chakpa. For example, Kakching and Kwakta are Loi villages that are not Chakpa.

Documentation
Chakpa is preserved in written manuscripts that are recited by religious scholars during traditional ceremonies, such as those of the Lai Haraoba festival.

Chakpa word lists can be found in McCulloch (1859) and Basanta (1998).

The Chairel variety is documented in a word list by McCulloch (1859).

References

Further reading

 
 

Sal languages
Languages of Myanmar